Eutropis austini is a species of skink, a lizard in the family Scincidae. The species is endemic to Sri Lanka.

Etymology
The specific name, austini, is in honor of American herpetologist Christopher C. Austin.

Habitat

Description
Dorsally, it is bronze brown.

Reproduction
The mode of reproduction of E. austini is unknown.

References

Further reading
Batuwita S (2016). "Description of Two New Species of Eutropis (Reptilia: Scincidae) from Sri Lanka with a Redescription of Eutropis madaraszi (Méhely)". Journal of Herpetology 50 (3): 486–496. (Eutropis austini, new species).

Eutropis
Reptiles described in 2016
Reptiles of Sri Lanka
Endemic fauna of Sri Lanka
Taxa named by Sudesh Batuwita